The 1981 Eastern Suburbs Roosters season was the 74th in the club's history. Coached by Bob Fulton and captained by Royce Ayliffe, they played in the pre-season 1981 Craven Mild Cup, which they won and also in the 1981 Tooth Cup. The Roosters competed in the NSWRFL's 1981 premiership, finishing the regular season 1st (out of 12) to claim the minor premiership. They then came within one match of the grand final but were knocked out by the Newtown Jets.

Season details 

Home Ground: Sydney Sports Ground
Coach: Bob Fulton
Lineup: 
Royce Ayliffe (c)
 Ian Barkley
 Kerry Boustead
 Dave Brown
 Noel Cleal
 Terry Fahey
 Jeff Fisher
 Bruce Foye
 Ron Giteau
 Marty Gurr
 John Harvey
 Kevin Hastings
 Robert 'Rockie' Laurie
 Jeff Masterman
 Paul McCabe
 David Michael
 Terry Murphy

Season Highlights

Eastern Suburbs finished the Premiership season as minor premiers and won the rich Pre Season Cup. Kevin Hastings won Rugby League's major award, the Rothmans Medal, as well as winning the popular media award 'Rugby League Week's' player of the year.

Representatives:- Royce Ayliffe(Aus), Kerry Boustead(Aus), Paul McCabe(Aus), Jeff Masterman(Aus)

References

Sydney Roosters seasons
Eastern Suburbs Roosters season